London Transport Football Club was a football club based in London, England.

History
Founded in 1925, London Transport joined the London Business Houses League. In 1945, London Transport joined the London League. The following year, the club entered the FA Cup, losing 9–0 away to Barking in the extra preliminary round. In 1964, London Transport joined the Greater London League. London Transport performed poorly in their stint in the league, finishing bottom four seasons out of five in their respective division.

Ground
During London Transport's stay in the Greater London League, the club played at Langley Park in Beckenham. The club later moved across London to play at Old Kenton Lane in Kingsbury.

Records
Best FA Cup performance: Preliminary round, 1947–48

References

Sport in the London Borough of Bromley
Sport in the London Borough of Brent
Works association football teams in England
1925 establishments in England
Association football clubs established in 1925
London League (football)
Greater London League
Defunct football clubs in London